Pericline also refers to a doubly plunging anticline or syncline.

Pericline is a form of albite exhibiting elongate prismatic crystals.

Pericline twinning is a type of crystal twinning which show fine parallel twin laminae typically found in the alkali feldspars microcline.  The twinning results from a structural transformation between high temperature and low temperature forms.

References

Crystallography
Tectosilicates